A Severe Young Man is a 1936 Soviet drama film directed by Abram Room.

Plot 
The film tells about a young sportsman Gregory, who falls in love with the wife of an outstanding scientist - Julian Nikolayevich Stepanov.  After completion, the film was suppressed until the 1970s because it did not conform to the Soviet doctrine of Socialist Realism.

Starring 
 Dmitri Dorlyak as Grisha Fokin
 Olga Zhizneva as Masha Stepanova
 Yuri Yuryev as Professor Yuliyan Stepanov
 Maksim Shtraukh as Fyodor Tsitronov
 Valentina Serova as Liza
 Georgiy Sochevko as Kolya
 Irina Volodko as Olga
 Aleksandr Chistyakov as Olga's Father
 Dmitri Golubinsky as Surgeon Ivan Germanovich
 Ekaterina Melnikova as Grisha's Mother

References

External links 

1936 films
1930s Russian-language films
Soviet drama films
1936 drama films
Soviet black-and-white films